The Primera División de Ascenso is the second highest level of football in Guatemala. Formerly, it was known as Liga Mayor "B". It is sanctioned by the National Football Federation of Guatemala.

It is composed of two groups of ten teams each. The top 3 teams of each group go to the promotion playoffs. The bottom two teams of each group go to the relegation playoffs against each other. The winner stays, while the loser gets relegated and the winners of the Segunda Division will be automatically promoted.

Primera División de Ascenso teams 
2022-23 Season

External links
 Liga Primera División de Ascenso 
League Summary Soccerway 

2
Guat